La Jaiba is a division and barrio in the municipality of Matanzas, Cuba.

Geography
La Jaiba is in the ward of Pueblo Nuevo, Matanzas. La Jaiba borders Reparto Naranjal Sur and the San Juan River to the north-east. To the north it borders Reparto Pueblo Nuevo. To the south and east it borders Reparto Camilo Cienfuegos.

Media
In La Jaiba there are 3 radio stations, these include Radio Reloj, Radio Rebelde, and Radio 26.

References

Matanzas